Gerrit Jan 'Gert-Jan' Liefers (born 26 September 1978 in Apeldoorn, Gelderland) is a former Dutch middle distance runner, who came 8th in the 1500 m final at the 2004 Olympics. He was also a finalist in the same event in the 2001 and 2003 World Championships.

Liefers finished 8th in the 5000 m final at the 2006 European Athletics Championships in Gothenburg. He is the Dutch record holder at 1500 m, the mile and 3000 m.

Competition record

External links

1978 births
Living people
Dutch male middle-distance runners
Athletes (track and field) at the 2004 Summer Olympics
Olympic athletes of the Netherlands
Sportspeople from Apeldoorn
21st-century Dutch people